Nationality words link to articles with information on the nation's poetry or literature (for instance, Irish or France).

Events

Works published

Great Britain
 John Clavell, A Recantation of an Ill Led Life; or, A Discoverie of the High-way Law
 Phineas Fletcher, 'Brittain's Ida, published anonymously; has been attributed to Edmund Spenser and Giles Fletcher the younger
 Robert Gomersall, The Levites Revenge Robert Hayman, Qvodlibets ("What you will"), the first book of English poetry written in what would become Canada, written by the Proprietary Governor of Bristol's Hope colony in Newfoundland
 Thomas May, translator, Virgil's Georgicks Englished Henry Reynolds, Torquato Tasso's Aminta Englisht George Wither, Britain's Remembrancer: Containing a narration of the plague lately past (see also Haleluiah 1641)

Other
 Luis de Góngora, a calf-bound, de luxe, three-volume edition of the author's works, authorized and compiled in collaboration with Antonio Chacón y Ponce de León in 1620, considered to be the most authoritative version of Gongora's works. The "publication" here was the book's presentation to the Conde-Duque de Olivares

Births
Death years link to the corresponding "[year] in poetry" article:
 January 30 – George Villiers, 2nd Duke of Buckingham (died 1687), English statesman and poet
 Bahinabai (died 1700), Varkari female poet-saint from Maharashtra
 François Colletet (died 1680), French
 Zbigniew Morsztyn (died 1689), Polish poet

Deaths
Birth years link to the corresponding "[year] in poetry" article:
 February –  Christopher Brooke, English poet, lawyer and politician
 February 3 – Simon Goulart (born 1543) Swiss, French-language clergyman, writer and poet
 February 5 (bur.)'' – Christopher Middleton, (born c. 1560), English poet and translator
 August 1 – Juraj Baraković (born 1548), Croatian Renaissance poet from Zadar
 September 30 – Fulke Greville, 1st Baron Brooke (born 1554), English poet, dramatist and statesman
 October 16 – François de Malherbe (born 1555), French

See also

 Poetry
 16th century in poetry
 16th century in literature

Notes

17th-century poetry
Poetry